"Operator (That's Not the Way It Feels)" is a 1972 song written by Jim Croce. Croce's record was released on August 23, 1972. It was the second single released from Croce's album You Don't Mess Around with Jim. It reached a peak of #17 on the Billboard Hot 100 in December 1972, spending twelve weeks on the chart.

There is a similar song written by Ron "Pigpen" McKernan of the Grateful Dead and released on their 1970 American Beauty album. However, Croce's song predates the McKernan song by several years . There are numerous mid-1960s recordings available of Jim Croce performances that include his exact version of "Operator (That's Not the Way It Feels)." While the song-stories are similar, they are distinctly different songs.

Content
Cash Box described the lyrics saying that "in James Taylor fashion, Jim Croce tries to track down his long lost lover with the help of the operator."

The song relates one side of a conversation with a telephone operator. The speaker is trying to find the phone number of his former lover, who has moved to Los Angeles with his former best friend. He wants to demonstrate to both of them that he is well and over their betrayal, but admits to the operator that he is not. After the operator has given him the number, he is unable to read it, apparently due to the tears in his eyes. He then changes his mind and tells the operator not to place the call, appreciatively adding "you can keep the dime" (the then standard toll he had deposited in a payphone).

The story was inspired during Croce's military service, during which time he saw lines of soldiers waiting to use the outdoor phone on base, many of them calling their wives or girlfriends to see if their Dear John letter was true.

Live performances
In 1973 Croce performed "Operator (That's Not the Way It Feels)" on the series The Midnight Special. Live versions of the song have also been released on the albums Jim Croce Live: The Final Tour and Have You Heard: Jim Croce Live.

Track listing
7" Single (ABC-11335)
 "Operator (That's Not The Way It Feels)" - 3:45
 "Rapid Roy (The Stock Car Boy) " - 2:40

Chart performance

References
 

1972 singles
Jim Croce songs
Songs about telephone calls
Songs written by Jim Croce
1972 songs
ABC Records singles
Vertigo Records singles